Wilhelm Mink (1807, Krefeld – 1883) was a German entomologist who specialised in Coleoptera and Hymenoptera . He was a teacher in Krefeld. His collection is in the Städt. Museum Annaberg-Buchholz in Saxony.

Mink, Wilhelm
1807 births
1883 deaths